Choluteca may refer to:

 Choluteca, Choluteca, a city in Honduras
 Choluteca Department, a governmental region in Honduras
 Choluteca River, a river in Honduras